It Couldn't Matter Less is a 1941 thriller novel by the British writer Peter Cheyney. It is the fourth in a series of novels featuring the London-based private detective Slim Callaghan who enjoyed a series of dangerous adventures similar in style to the hardboiled American detectives created by Raymond Chandler and Dashiell Hammett. It was published in the United States as Set-Up for Murder.

Synopsis
Callaghan is persuaded by Inspector Gringall of Scotland Yard to meet with Doria Varette a torch singer in a nightclub. She hires Callaghan to look for her missing boyfriend Lionel Wilbery. Before long Callaghan realise he has got into a case that is far more complex than it first seems.

Film adaptation
In 1955 it was adapted into the French film More Whiskey for Callaghan directed by Willy Rozier and starring Tony Wright, Magali Vendeuil and Robert Berri.

References

Bibliography
 Goble, Alan. The Complete Index to Literary Sources in Film. Walter de Gruyter, 1999.
Magill, Frank Northen. Critical Survey of Mystery and Detective Fiction: Authors, Volume 1. Salem Press, 1988.

1941 British novels
Novels by Peter Cheyney
British thriller novels
British crime novels
Novels set in London
William Collins, Sons books
British novels adapted into films